HMC Valiant is a Border Force (customs), formerly UK Border Agency, cutter of the United Kingdom.  She was launched by Damen Shipyards in the Netherlands in 2003 and is one of four  cutters formerly operated by His Majesty's Revenue and Customs, and since 2008 operated by the UK Border Agency and after its dissolution in 2013 operated by the UK Border Force.

Prefix
The Inland Revenue and HM Customs and Excise Departments merged to form HM Revenue and Customs on 18 April 2005, and from this time customs cutters changed their prefix from "HMRC" (His Majesty's Revenue Cutter) to "HMCC" (His Majesty's Customs Cutter). Following transfer to the UK Border Agency this was shortened to the current "HMC" (His Majesty's Cutter) and a new livery applied to the fleet of cutters.

Construction
HMC Valiant is the fourth of the Customs and Excise's fleet of  customs patrol vessels.  She was built in 2003 in the Damen Shipyards in the Netherlands, and has a steel hull with an aluminium superstructure. Much effort has been expended in making her quiet to reduce crew fatigue; the engines are raft-mounted, decks throughout the ship are of a floating type, and her compartments are constructed on a box-within-a-box principle.

A  Rigid Inflatable Boat (RIB) can be launched from her stern slipway.

Propulsion

Valiant is fitted with twin Caterpillar 3516B DI-TA Elec engines driving twin 4-bladed controllable-pitch propellers through a pair of 3.5:1 reduction gearboxes. A single Promac bow thruster is installed for slow speed manoeuvring in confined spaces. Electrical power is supplied by a pair of 106kWA generators.

Operational history
On 23 April 2015, together with the Royal Navy frigate Somerset, she intercepted the Tanzanian-registered tug Hamal in the North Sea, about 100 miles off Aberdeen, leading to the seizure of more than three tons of cocaine, believed to be the single largest seizure of a Class A drug in the UK.

In June 2021, it was revealed that the Valiant had successfully requested permission to enter French waters to pick up migrants and take them to Britain. The Home Office launched an urgent investigation into the matter.

References

External links

Ships built in Vlissingen
Ships of the United Kingdom
2004 ships
Customs cutters of the United Kingdom